Milly Babirye Babalanda (born 5th December 1970) is a Ugandan politician. She became Minister of the Presidency in the Cabinet of Uganda under President Yoweri Museveni in June 2021. She is reportedly one of the Presidents most influential ministers.

Early life 
She was born in Nalinaibi village in Kamuli district.

Political career 
She is a member of the ruling National Resistance Movement party.

Personal life 
Her husband is a Seventh-day Adventist pastor.

External links 

 Babalanda on Twitter

References 

1970 births
Living people
Women government ministers of Uganda
Women members of the Parliament of Uganda
Members of the Parliament of Uganda
21st-century Ugandan women politicians
21st-century Ugandan politicians

Ugandan Seventh-day Adventists
People from Kamuli District
National Resistance Movement politicians